Roland Dussault was a politician in Quebec, Canada.

Background

He was born on November 15, 1940 in Breakeyville and made career in education.  Before he ran for office, Dussault was a Rassemblement pour l'indépendance nationale activist.

Political career

Dussault unsuccessfully ran as a Parti Québécois candidate to the National Assembly of Quebec in the district of Châteauguay in the 1973 election.  He was elected in the 1976 and was re-elected in 1981 elections.

He served as his party's Deputy House Whip from 1979 to 1981 and as parliamentary assistant from 1981 to 1985.

Dussault was defeated in the 1985 election.

Retirement

After his retirement from public office, Dussault joined the Raëlian Movement.

Footnotes

1940 births
Living people
Parti Québécois MNAs
Raëlians